William Cleite Boaventura (born February 14, 1980 in Brazil) is a retired Brazilian footballer.

Career
"Boa" started his career in the Brazilian team Cabofriense and arrived in Cyprus the summer of 2004, showing good skills while playing for AEL Limassol. Two years later he moved to Anorthosis Famagusta, where he stayed for another two years. At Anorthosis he won the 2006–07 Cypriot Cup and the 2007–08 Cypriot First Division.

At the end of season 2007–2008 he left for Ukraine and Metalurh Donetsk. In 2009 Boa played in Russia's Kuban (on loan from Metalurh Donetsk) where he had 25 appearances and then returned in Metalurh.

On 17 June 2010, Boaventura returned to Cyprus and agreed for a two years contract with APOEL. At APOEL, Boaventura won his second championship title in his career, by helping the team to win the 2010–11 Cypriot First Division. The following season he appeared in seven official 2011–12 UEFA Champions League matches for APOEL, in the club's surprising run to the quarter-finals of the competition.

On 6 June 2012, he returned to Anorthosis Famagusta, signing a one-year contract with the club, but in September 2012, Boaventura forced to stop his career at 32 years old because he was treated heart problems.

Honours
Anorthosis
 Cypriot First Division: 2007–08
 Cypriot Cup: 2006–07
 Cypriot Super Cup: 2007

APOEL
 Cypriot First Division: 2010–11
 Cypriot Super Cup: 2011

External links

1980 births
Living people
Brazilian footballers
Brazilian expatriate footballers
Associação Desportiva Cabofriense players
Anorthosis Famagusta F.C. players
AEL Limassol players
FC Metalurh Donetsk players
FC Kuban Krasnodar players
APOEL FC players
Expatriate footballers in Cyprus
Expatriate footballers in Ukraine
Brazilian expatriate sportspeople in Ukraine
Expatriate footballers in Russia
Cypriot First Division players
Ukrainian Premier League players
Russian Premier League players
Association football midfielders
Association football fullbacks